
Civic Center, Denver is a neighborhood in Denver, Colorado, United States. The northern part of the neighborhood overlaps partially with the Denver Civic Center, an area of parks and civic buildings.

The U.S. Census estimated the population of the neighborhood in 2017 as 1,962.
 The neighborhood has become popularly known as the Golden Triangle, particularly since a redevelopment boom beginning in the 1990s.

The Civic Center neighborhood is one of the City of Denver's official neighborhoods designated for planning and city services' delivery purposes.

The boundaries of the official neighborhood are:
North – Colfax Avenue
West and south – Speer Boulevard
East – Broadway

It includes the Civic Center Park and some of its surrounding government and cultural institutions that comprise the Denver Civic Center, although not the center's Lincoln Park, not the Colorado State Capitol building in the center's east end, and not the center's few buildings north of Colfax.

The "Golden Triangle Creative District" is an organization of residents and property owners which is an officially-recognized Registered Neighborhood Organization, and was formerly known at the Golden Triangle Neighborhood Association.  This organization defines its area to be slightly larger, with its eastern border at Lincoln, one block further east (and thereby including Lincoln Park).  This neighborhood association notes that it spans 45 city blocks with 16 or more galleries and museums and with dozens of restaurants and stores.  The creative district became official in 2016.  In 2018 it began an effort to become, further, a business improvement district which would be able to assess taxes and improve public infrastructure.

The Downtown Denver Partnership and the Golden Triangle Neighborhood Association define the Golden Triangle as extending one block east to Lincoln Street, thereby incorporating almost all of Civic Center Park and the institutions surrounding them (with the exception of the Colorado State Capitol in the Capitol Hill neighborhood and a few buildings to the north of Colfax Avenue).  The main arterial street through the Golden Triangle is Bannock Street; 13th, 14th, and 8th avenues are important east-west arterials as well. All of the streets that provide the borders for the neighborhood (Lincoln/Broadway, Colfax, and Speer) are important transportation corridors for Denver.

History
The Civic Center or Golden Triangle is one of the oldest neighborhoods in Denver, with many single family Victorian homes and bungalows built in the late 19th and early 20th centuries. Between 1904 and 1919, Denver Mayor Robert Speer completed  his ambitious plan for the downtown Civic Center area, on the north edge of the larger neighborhood, adding many civic institutions and a neoclassic park.  The plan also placed a leafy concrete urban canyon around Cherry Creek, creating Speer Boulevard, the larger neighborhood's western and southern border.

Starting in the 1990s, perhaps as the result of the new Central Library, the neighborhood began its transformation into a functional multi-use neighborhood. New condominium and loft developments came into the neighborhood, and many of the old supply stores and garages were transformed into restaurants, art galleries, and small offices.

Today

The Golden Triangle continues to undergo many transformations. The Denver Art Museum's new wing was completed in fall 2006, further developing the neighborhood's art scene, which includes various art galleries and the Curious Theatre Company. Denver's new justice center and jail opened in late 2010. In 2012, the agency opened the new state history museum of Colorado, the History Colorado Center. That same year the Colorado State Judiciary building opened. 

The average sale price for a home in Golden Triangle in June of 2016 was $659,900.

References

External links
Golden Triangle Association
Downtown Denver Partnership
Usaj Realty

Neighborhoods in Denver